The 1970 British Annapurna South Face expedition was a Himalayan climb that was the first to take a deliberately difficult route up the face of an 8,000-metre mountain. Chris Bonington led the expedition which approached up a glacier from the Annapurna Sanctuary and then used rock climbing techniques to put fixed ropes up the steep South Face. Although the plan had been to use supplementary oxygen, in the event it was not possible to carry any cylinders high enough for the lead climbers to use on their summit bid.

Low down on the mountain, on 30 May as the expedition was about to leave, Ian Clough was killed by a falling serac. Several members of the expedition rose to fame in Britain, and as a whole the expedition received international recognition in mountaineering circles on account of its innovative and extremely difficult nature.

Background

Annapurna 

The Annapurna massif is in the Eastern Himalayaa region of Nepal where for over one hundred years the ruling Rana dynasty  had not allowed explorers or mountaineers to enter the country. In 1950 Nepal at last gave permission for the 1950 French Annapurna expedition, to attempt Dhaulagiri or Annapurna I, the two highest peaks in the Annapurna region. The expedition, led by Maurice Herzog, mounted a successful summit attempt via the North Face. For most Himalayan mountains the easiest route to the summit is along a ridge route but for Annapurna the North Face is not too steep (though it is very exposed to avalanches) and the route subsequently turned out to be the easiest. Although it was the first climbed of the eight-thousanders, Annapurna is not often climbed and there is a high death rate among those attempting it.

Start of rock climbing in Himalaya 
After years of stagnation between the wars, British rock climbing underwent a renaissance, particularly with working-class climbing clubs starting up in the north of England and Scotland. The Rock and Ice Club in Manchester, the Creagh Dhu Mountaineering Club in Glasgow and several university climbing clubs were amongst those that engendered a highly competitive climbing environment. At Clogwyn Du'r Arddu in Wales numerous routes of a very high standard were achieved using strictly free climbing techniques. Hamish MacInnes and Dougal Haston, although not members, climbed with Creagh Dhu and MacInnes had mentored Chris Bonington's youthful climbing as early as 1953.

Mount Everest was ascended in 1963 by an American team along a deliberately difficult route along its West Ridge.  Two years later, when planning with the American John Harlin for Harlin's direttissima attempt on the North Face of the Eiger, Harlin introduced Bonington to the American big wall technique of directly ascending a fixed rope using jumars. Harlin fell to his death and Haston's success on the route were reported on by Bonington and Mick Burke who were on the North Face as climbing journalist and cameraman. The publicity led to the televising of a climb of the Old Man of Hoy in Scotland, this time featuring Bonington and Haston. From this start, commercial sponsorship became a possibility for rock climbing and more elaborate and ambitious expeditions could be planned. With all fourteen 8000-metre peaks climbed by 1964, Himalayan expeditions using rock climbing routes became an opportunity Bonington wanted to seize.

Encouraged by Roberts, Bonington conceived of the idea of climbing Annapurna by its South Face which he realised was going to require not just rock climbing but also siege climbing tactics because the ascent would take many weeks. No one had tried rock climbing at high altitude before. The face itself was almost twice as high as the  Eigerwand and even above the rock band there was another  to the summit.  The topography near the summit could be assessed from photographs Bonington had taken on the Annapurna II expedition of ten years earlier.

Planning

With financial support for the expedition from the Mount Everest Foundation, Bonington assembled a team from amongst his friends: Nick Estcourt, Martin Boysen, Ian Clough, Mike Thompson, Burke and Haston. Advised to include an American to boost sales of the book he was planning, Bonington appointed Tom Frost who had considerable big wall experience in Yosemite as well as – secretly at the time – Nanda Devi on a CIA mission to install a nuclear-powered listening device for monitoring Chinese missiles. Frost was known to and respected by Haston and Don Whillans. Whillans was to be deputy leader for, although by then he was an overweight heavy drinker and smoker who disliked Bonington, he had more Himalayan experience than any other British mountaineer still active. Indeed, of the team assembled, only he, Bonington and Clough had been to Himalaya at all. Also included as climbers were Kelvin Kent, base camp manager, and David Lambert, the doctor. A four-man television team from ITN and Thames Television was to accompany them.

Departure
They took  of rope for fixing (they did not use their climbing rope), 40 cylinders of oxygen and six breathing sets. The baggage was sent from London by sea with Whillans and Lambert flying to Bombay to see to its unloading and transport to Pokhara by lorry. However, the ship was then delayed by about three weeks so Bonington arranged for Whillans and Lambert to travel to Kathmandu to reconnoitre the approach route instead of waiting at Bombay, and Clough would go to Bombay to deal with the baggage. They took oxygen cylinders intending to use supplementary oxygen above about  but it was very little used for climbing and not at all above Camp VI. It was used, however, for people who had become ill.

Expedition

March-in and Base Camp

In March 1970 the expedition flew to Kathmandu and then on to Pokhara from where the trek to the southern vicinity of Annapurna was along an easy route. Unlike twenty years earlier when Herzog had no satisfactory map and had to pioneer a route, by 1970 the track was well known even to hippie wanderers. Another change was that the Sherpas were no longer unsophisticated peasants – they were smart in appearance, spoke good English and had a Western attitude. Pasang Kami, the sirdar, treated the sahibs as equals and this was reciprocated. The other Sherpas were Pemba Tharkay, Ang Pema, Mingma Tsering, Nima Tsering and Kancha. As it turned out, a group from the British Army Mountaineering Association, led by Henry Day, was setting off at the same time for an ascent on Herzog's north face route and they had greatly helped Bonington by flying out  of baggage to supply him until his main baggage arrived.

On 16 March Whillans, Thompson and two Sherpas went ahead of the main parties to reconnoitre the route and to find a suitable place for the base camp. A temporary location was found to be at the entrance to the Annapurna Sanctuary at the location of a previous base camp: that of the 1957 expedition to Machapuchare.
The slower-moving baggage train of 140 porters set off from Pokhara on 22 March and Clough with his 240 porters was able to leave Bombay with the delayed baggage on 24 March.

Bonington and Whillans met up on 27 March and Whillans said he thought he and his Sherpas had seen a yeti and had photographed the footprints. More significantly, he had been able to identify a climbing route up the mountain's south face. After the whole party has gathered at the temporary base camp on 29 March an advance party including Whillans, Haston and Burke established a final base camp at  three miles from the foot of the face. Estcourt used a theodolite to make accurate altitude measurements of various points on the face because foreshortening makes estimation inaccurate. The porters returned to Pokhara from where many of them would help move up to Base Camp the main baggage being carried from Bombay by the party led by Clough, Thompson and Kent. Meanwhile, the lead climbers and Sherpas were left to ferry the advance baggage up to the final Base Camp. The monsoon was due at about the end of May.

Climbing route

To Camp III and abortive start up Ice Ridge
Whillans and Haston had found a difficult route across the glacier and up to a rognon – an island of rock on a glacier – where Camp I was planned to be and then reached the flattish top of the rognon where Camp I would be just far enough away from the face – about a mile away – to avoid avalanche danger. Bonington and Burke relocated the lower part of the route hoping to make it suitable for porters.

The ridge they were to use at the start of the climb was straightforwardly approached across the glacier but steep cliffs barred the way onto the ridge itself so they skirted these on the right to reach a site for Camp II, lower than hoped for but with nowhere suitable immediately higher. For a short distance the route was seriously threatened by an ice overhang which they called the "Sword of Damocles" but they decided to reduce the risk by moving under it as quickly as possible.

When he arrived with the main baggage Clough was supposed to stop at Hinko Cave overnight on 7 April but, due to confusing instructions, with his entourage of 240 porters he continued on in a snowstorm to temporary base camp some miles further on. Some porters had refused to go beyond Hinko Cave and the rest, overloaded and without adequate clothes and shoes in the bad weather, variously got into states of anger and collapse. However, now the main gear had arrived, it was possible to sort out shelter under cover for the night and provide medical help when necessary. On this same day Whillans and Haston had reached the Ice Ridge at a col where Camp III was to be established. They had to climb through deep snow in bad weather. In ten days the expedition had got from the Sanctuary to half height on the face, although with the difficult climbing all to be done further ahead. They abseiled down to Camp II from where, next day, they started placing fixed ropes towards the col.

On 11 March Boysen and Estcourt established Camp III on the col, where there were to be two Whillans Box tents at a spacious location, free from risk of avalanches or falling rocks. The version used on Annapurna, designed by Whillans, was cuboid in shape, made of socketed aluminium tubes covered in nylon top and bottom and cotton-terylene at the sides. It was strengthened with nylon webbing straps and at one end was a nylon-zipped entrance. An inner nylon tent was available but not always used. It weighed 

On 12 April, after Bonington had organised the logistics of getting Base Camp fully set up and equipped, he and Frost set from there so that on 14 April they could start to prospect a route up the Ice Ridge above Camp III. After investigating a snow shelf leading to a gully on the west of the ridge, Bonington decided avalanches posed too great a threat so he joined Frost who was ascending along the actual crest of the ridge. However, this turned out to be much more difficult than they had expected with snow too soft and loose for firm piton placements and there would be a need to set fixed ropes all the way up the ridge. Also, they had not formed a plan for placing fixed ropes – should the lead climber fix his rope or should he climb normally leaving the second climber to pay out a rope from his rucksack, fixing it as he climbed? To begin with the latter method seemed more successful but progress was dreadfully slow with Bonington never having previously encountered such appalling snow. Later in the expedition the technique changed and they climbed using their  fixed rope which they then secured with pitons and karabiners, not using their  climbing rope at all.

That night at Camp III they discussed their religious beliefs – Bonington was a sceptic and Frost a Mormon. Bonington wrote to his wife "He is a convinced and fervent Mormon, never rams it down your throat, yet his faith has given him a code of conduct that puts him way out in front of most of us". Next day it was straightforward to re-climb their fixed rope but again onward climbing was extremely difficult. On the previous day and this one Whillans and Haston had been ferrying supplies from Camp II up to Camp III and following their second climb they started exploring the shelf which Bonington had investigated previously beside the ridge. Here they made such good progress that the pair on the ridge needed little persuasion to abandon  entirely their efforts on the lowest part of the ridge.

Next day all four climbers set off along the shelf with Haston breaking trail and never surrendering the lead. The avalanche risk was considerable even though they kept their distance from the ridge and matters got worse as they reached the gully threatened by avalanches from ice cliffs thousands of feet above and by cornices on the ridge itself. They decided to avoid the gully by climbing a minor arête which led from the foot of the gully up to a high point on the main ridge but they had to leave a deadman anchor when deteriorating weather forced them to retreat to camp. Next day Bonington and Frost got within  of the crest of the Ice Ridge but again bad weather forced a retreat.

By 18 April only  had been gained since the Col had been reached eleven days earlier and from Base Camp and on 19 April Haston again ascended the minor arête where the way to the main ridge was blocked by huge cornices but he found he could slip through gaps in the rotten snow between the wall of the ridge and one of the cornices. However, after reaching the crest of main ridge and fixing a rope he was forced back by the weather. At last, two days later, he was able to reach the Ice Ridge and find an ideal place for Camp IV.

The expedition was unexpectedly enhanced when four trekkers – the Sherpas called them the "London Sherpas" – turned up at Base Camp completely unexpectedly. In return for "board and lodging" the two men helped carry loads even as high as Camp IV and the women helped at Base Camp where Bonington thought their presence engendered a more civilised and relaxed air. Other trekkers also turned up to get a grandstand view of the climb and to help carrying loads.

Camp IV to Camp V on the Rock Band
Boysen, Estcourt, Haston and Whillans worked together establishing Camp IV but the situation at Camp III became critical after several attempts to supply it from Camp II had failed because of deep snow and avalanches. Eventually an overnight carry was successful and in general it seemed the snow conditions improved the higher one got up the mountain.

Boysen and Estcourt tackled the upper part of the Ice Ridge above Camp IV which was very narrow with cornices to the left but solid rock on the right. At one point Boysen's progress was blocked except for a  tunnel which he could clamber through, without his rucksack, as if potholing. The tunnel led not further up the ridge but out onto an ice cliff with a  drop to the glacier. However, he managed to climb onto and up the cliff despite the drag of his climbing rope passing along a highly contorted route behind him. When he reached safety he had let out  of rope in ascending only . It was the most difficult ice climb Boysen had ever done. There was no direct way for Estcourt to ascend to Boysen's stance so he had to repeat the circuitous climb. Boysen's next lead again went on to a traverse, which was later called the "Terrible Traverse", which he was not able to complete before descending to Camp IV for the night. They had spent all day climbing . Next day it again proved impossible to keep to the crest of the ridge but a descent on the right to solid rock gave access to an ice-covered rock wall leading upwards. This climb had to be without the rope being secured with pitons because the rope would have jammed along its contorted route. They regained the ridge again only some  higher than they had reached the previous day. The following day they extended their route slightly further. After that they had to go down to recover from exhaustion but the fixed ropes they had left allowed everyone following to take a direct line though one that was neither safe nor easy.

Bonington and Clough took over the work of extending the route, reaching Camp IV on 27 April. Sometimes they advanced only  in an hour. At Whillans' suggestion, they arranged for Sherpas to carry all the climbers'supplies up to Camp III so that when climbers went down to rest they only needed to go to Camp III rather than Base Camp. After a few very difficult days, and without being able to regain the crest of the Ice Ridge at a higher point, Clough went down to be replaced by Haston. On 3 May Whillans, Frost and Burke carried a box tent up to Camp IV while Bonington and Haston with very difficult ice climbing reached a col at  where the Ice Ridge terminates to be replaced by a snow slope leading up to the Ice Wall. Next day they carried a load of ropes to the col and Haston ran out  of rope towards the Ice Wall. At  the slope suddenly changes from 45° to vertical and this point was planned to become Camp V where a  hooped tent was set up, capable of sleeping three. Supplying as high as here was a logistical problem because it took at least five days for anything to arrive from base camp.

Supported by Frost and Burke, Whillans and Haston established Camp V but that night spindrift  inundated the site and the tent so they decided to find a better camp location. Next day they explored the Ice Wall finding a "gangway" leading to the top of the Ice Wall and the foot of the Rock Band. At this point the overhang of the bergschrund, although threatening, provided excellent shelter so they proposed moving Camp V to this point. On 9 May Frost and Burke established the camp at the new, higher location. The climb from Camp IV to V was very long and difficult so two intermediate dumps for supplies were used with carrying being done in shorter sections from above and below.

Above Camp V

Frost and Burke started on the Rock Band which sloped at about 50° Instead of taking the most direct line up a groove leading straight upwards, they cut over to the left aiming for the "Flat Iron", named after the similar-looking feature on the Eiger, with Burke doing the lead climbing. The good weather helped with the climbing but because of the thaw they were bombarded  from above by falling rocks. The climbers further down the mountain were having to rest through illness or exhaustion so shortages of rope, oxygen, tents, food and fuel built up towards Camp V. On 12 May Burke and Frost made more progress but only through taking serious risks with inadequate piton placements but when they turned back for the day a storm hit them and their tent was almost buried. Fortunately by that time fresh supplies had arrived from lower camps.

Bonington's general plan had been to pair off the leading climbers and to share the work of the pairs equitably by having periods of rest, carrying supplies to higher camps and extending the route. The Sherpas were carrying higher up the mountain than expected and other trekkers with climbing experience had turned up by chance and helped out. However at the higher camps things were not going so well and so on 13 May Bonington decided that when Frost and Burke came down to be rested they would be replaced by Whillans and Haston. In fact it was the turn of Estcourt and Boysen to force the route upwards but they had been working hard doing carrying while Whillans and Haston were rested. Over the radio between various camps some of the adversely affected climbers complained but were accepting it after Bonington agreed for Whillans and Haston to do a single carry before rotating into the lead. Whillans then started criticising Burke and Frost for making very slow progress on the Rock Band and so, to curtail the increasing bitterness, the radio call was ended leaving each pair to plan the detail of their newly assigned roles.

On their last day in the lead Burke and Frost, possibly goaded by the criticism, managed to fix ropes up all the way to the Flat Iron. Burke had been on the face for 28 days, and Frost only slightly less – Bonington thought Burke's climb had been on the most exacting rock of the entire expedition. When Frost met Bonington down at Camp II he firmly told him he thought the stab in the back of Estcourt and Boysen had wrecked the morale of the expedition – all the same he maintained his close relationship with Bonington.

On 17 May Boysen, Whillans and Haston carried equipment to the top of the Flat Iron to a suitable site for Camp VI but on the way Boysen had to return to camp to recover. Whillans and Haston found a site for Camp VI but that night at Camp V the ridge tent was crushed with an avalanche of snow so Estcourt and Haston went down to the upper dump to collect the one intended for Camp VII and to get more food. Climbing back to Camp VI on 19 May, Haston's rucksack, containing his personal gear and food for Camp VI, fell down the mountain. So, that night, Whillans was alone at Camp VII with no food after the others had descended. Estcourt was alone at Camp V and so Bonington went up there to help him support the lead team. The climb from there to Camp VI was even more tiring and Bonington scarcely managed the  jumar climb near the top. However, he managed and even took the time on his way down to relocate the dangling rope and place further pitons on this pitch of the climb. As for oxygen, there were only three bottles at Camp V and another three at the upper dump. There was hardly any food or rope at Camp VI.

On 20 May Haston returned to Camp VI where Whillans had been without food for over twenty-four hours. Bonington carried up there more food and a radio but had to dump the rope slightly below the camp. Camp VI was a terrible place – the tent was too large to fit on the ledge so Whillans and Haston had to sleep lying across the width of the tent. Also, the wind was severe and it was only held by two tent pegs, a rope over the top, and the weight of the climbers. The same day Estcourt carried the oxygen bottles up to Camp V from the upper dump and the lead climbers climbed  up from Camp VI but they were then out of food and rope and had no tent to pitch for Camp VII which they intended to place at the top of the Rock Band. They heard news that the army team on the other side of the mountain had reached the summit using a similar route to that of the French expedition in 1950.

On 22 May Bonington and Estcourt headed up with supplies and oxygen cylinders towards Camp VI but Estcourt had to retreat back and Bonington, who was using supplementary oxygen, had to abandon the tent and oxygen en route. They had reached the  snowfield above the Rock Band but without a tent or food. Next day Bonington carried tent, ciné camera and food up from V to VI but he had needed to abandon his personal gear so he had to turn down an offer to join then on a summit attempt, Bonington and so had to go down again but the tent could be carried up next day to be left on the snow field above Camp VI. On 23 May with insufficient rope and no tent for Camp VII, the lead climbers took a rest day.

In terrible conditions on 24 May Bonington and Clough managed a carry to Camp VI but found Haston and Whillans had been forced back there so all four climbers had to spend the night together in the two-man tent. Bonington and Clough got back to Camp IV but once there the weather became impossible.

Summit
For the next two days the entire mountain was snowbound and it seemed the monsoon had arrived but on 27 May 1970 at Camp VI there was an improvement in the weather. Leaving Camp VI about 07:00, without supplementary oxygen because they had none, Whillans and Haston reached the snow field at 11:00 from where they could see the summit through breaks in the cloud. They agreed to move the tent up to establish a camp at a higher location but they really had a more ambitious goal for the day. Indeed, any camp would be entirely lacking food or sleeping bags. They were faced with an ice plateau leading to a snow ridge and then an  cliff of mixed ice and rock rising up to the top of the mountain. They abandoned the tent at the foot of the ridge and climbed on without belays. Neither climber had any difficulty with breathing.

The last fifty feet of the ice cliff was vertical though there were good holds and as they reached the northern side of the mountain the wind dropped. They could see traces of army boot footprints but the flag that had been left a week earlier by the army expedition had blown away. Haston took a ciné film of Whillans reaching the summit and then they swapped places. From the top, which they reached at 14:30 and stayed for about 10 minutes, they could see the other two Annapurna summits but nothing more. With no feeling of exhilaration, which they knew would come later. They had  of rope which, after they had abseiled down, was all there was left on the summit. By 17:00 they had managed the difficult descent to Camp VI.

Lower down the mountain everyone had been completely stormbound but Bonington, having been confined to Camp IV, put in his routine 17:00 radio call asking Haston if they had been able to get out of their camp. Due to static on the radio he did not hear the reply "Aye, we've just climbed Annapurna" but this was heard load and clear at Base Camp and the news spread rapidly up the mountain.

Leaving the mountain
Burke and Frost wanted to make their own attempt on the summit and, contrary to his better judgement, Bonington agreed subject to the clearing of the camps proceeding at the same time. So on 28 May, Burke and Frost while Whillans and Haston descended, reaching Camp III at midday. Everyone was very excited but were held back by their British formality. Only by evening did Frost and Burke reach Camp VI. On 29 May they made their attempt but Burke had to turn back and Frost, having reached the snowfield, stayed there almost three hours but then, because it was the Lord's will, turned back in ferocious wind.

On 30 May the mountain was being cleared apace with most of the party reaching Base Camp when Thompson rushed down, calling out in despair. He and Clough had been passing under the place of the "Sword of Damocles" when a serac fell creating an avalanche which had killed Clough. His body was carried down to base camp and he was buried near there at the foot of a face where Clough had taught the Sherpas and the television crew to use jumars and to abseil. Returning down the valley they found the earlier snow had melted and flowers were blooming.

Aftermath
The expedition proved to be Britain's most important mountaineering achievement since the 1953 British Mount Everest expedition.

It was a huge success because not only was the summit reached but it had been, for its time, the most difficult technical climb to the summit of a major world peak. In mountaineering circles the expedition was recognised as a paradigm shift in alpine-style climbing. The expedition was at the beginning of a trend away from taking the easiest route on a high Himalayan peak towards choosing a more direct and difficult route.
For the first time in Britain a television audience had been able to watch the climb as it progressed. At least once a week interviews with the climbers and film of the climb itself were shown on News at Ten and it was possible to show film from the summit only five days after it had been taken – the film was carried back to base camp, taken by runner to Pokhara and then from there to London by air. Afterwards a one-hour documentary was shown on Thames Television.

Bonington went on to lead further Himalayan expeditions – the Everest Southwest Face expedition of 1975 was a direct successor with Boysen and Thompson participating and where Haston was one of those reaching the summit. On this occasion Burke died when attempting the summit by himself. Whillans was invited on no more Bonington expeditions. Haston died skiing off piste on the Swiss Alps in 1977, and Estcourt was killed in 1978 on K2 on another Bonington expedition.  By 1984 Pasang Kami owned the most lavish hotel in Kathmandu, built up from a yak shelter. It had a penthouse restaurant and was  even equipped with electric lighting.

On 8–9 October 2013, Ueli Steck climbed the South Face, solo and without rope or a support team, to reach Annapurna's summit, taking 28 hours in total over the climb from base camp and the descent.

Notes

References

Citations

Sources 
 
 
 
  This book is a compendium of three earlier Bonington volumes. The volume cited here is 
 
  This book is a compendium of three previous Bonington books. The volume discussing Annapurna South Face is 
 
 
  – clip from full documentary The Hardest Way Up
 
 
 
 
  Introduction by Shipton, Eric.

Further reading 
 

Himalayas
Expeditions from the United Kingdom
Anna
Annapurna 1970
Anna
Anna